Bowling (Spanish: Boliche), for the 2013 Bolivarian Games, took place from 23 November to 28 November 2013.

Medal table

Medalists

References

Events at the 2013 Bolivarian Games
2013 in bowling
2013 Bolivarian Games